Oktay Urkal (born 15 January 1970) is a Turkish-German former professional boxer. He is a former European super lightweight and welterweight champion, and a multiple time world title challenger.

Amateur career
As an amateur, Urkal won the silver medal in the light welterweight division at the 1996 Summer Olympics in Atlanta, United States. His official results were:
Defeated Reynaldo Galido (Philippines) 19-2
Defeated David Diaz (United States) 14-6
Defeated Nordine Mouichi (France) 19-10
Defeated Fathi Missaoui (Tunisia) 20-6
Lost to Hector Vinent (Cuba) 13-20

In the same year he captured the gold medal at the European Amateur Boxing Championships in Vejle, Denmark.

His Amateur Record was reportedly 184-27-5.

Professional career
Urkal is of Turkish descent, and has a fight record of 38 wins and 4 defeats. He is the former WBC International Light-Welterweight, twice European Light-Welterweight and European Welterweight champion. Urkal has fought for the world title three times losing to Kostya Tszyu and twice to Vivian Harris. He won four straight after his defeat to Harris; this winning streak came to an end on 4 March 2007, when WBA Welterweight champion Miguel Cotto successfully defendend his title when Urkal's corner threw in the towel after the referee deducted a second point for a headbutt, leading Urkal's corner to believe he was being unfair.

References

 

1970 births
Living people
Boxers from Berlin
German people of Turkish descent
Turkish male boxers
Boxers at the 1996 Summer Olympics
Olympic boxers of Germany
Olympic silver medalists for Germany
Olympic medalists in boxing
Welterweight boxers
German male boxers
European champions for Turkey
AIBA World Boxing Championships medalists
Medalists at the 1996 Summer Olympics